Susan Maree Ryan  (10 October 194227 September 2020) was an Australian politician and public servant. She was a member of the Australian Labor Party (ALP) and held ministerial office in the Hawke Government as Minister Assisting the Prime Minister for the Status of Women (1983–1988), Minister for Education and Youth Affairs (1983–1984), Minister for Education (1984–1987) and Special Minister of State (1987–1988). She was the first woman from the ALP to serve in cabinet and was notably involved in the creation of the Sex Discrimination Act 1984 and the Affirmative Action (Equal Opportunities in Employment) Act 1986. Ryan served as a senator for the Australian Capital Territory from 1975 to 1987. After leaving politics she served as the Age Discrimination Commissioner from 2011 to 2016, within the Australian Human Rights Commission.

Early life
Ryan was born on 10 October 1942 in Camperdown, New South Wales. She was the daughter of Florence Ena (née Hodson) and Arthur Francis Aloysius Ryan; her mother worked as a sales assistant and her father was a public servant. Ryan grew up in the suburb of Maroubra and attended the Brigidine Convent. She enrolled at the Sydney Teachers' College in 1960, graduating with a Bachelor of Arts in 1963. In the same year she married future diplomat Richard Butler.

Ryan worked as a schoolteacher until the birth of her first child in 1964, later running a small business, the Living Parish Hymn Book Publishing Company, from her home in Cremorne. In 1965 the family moved to Canberra for her husband's career. She enrolled as a postgraduate at the Australian National University (ANU), studying English literature. In 1966 the family moved to Austria, where Butler was second secretary at the Australian embassy in Vienna. They returned to Australia in 1969 and Ryan resumed her studies at ANU, also tutoring part-time at the Canberra College of Advanced Education. In 1970 they moved to New York for another of Butler's diplomatic postings; however, the marriage broke down and Ryan returned to Australia the following year. They divorced in 1972.

In 1973, Ryan graduated from ANU with a Master of Arts degree. In the same year she was appointed national executive officer of the Australian Council of State School Organisations. Ryan was also a foundation member of the Belconnen branch of the Australian Labor Party (ALP) and the Women's Electoral Lobby. She unsuccessfully stood for ALP preselection in the Division of Fraser prior to the 1974 federal election.

Political career
In 1974, Ryan was appointed to the non-governing ACT Advisory Council and elected to the non-governing ACT House of Assembly, serving briefly between 1975 and 1976 as the member for Fraser.

In 1975 she was elected as one of the first two senators for the ACT, on the slogan "A woman's place is in the Senate". She was the ACT's first female senator and first Labor senator. When the Hawke Labor government was elected in March 1983, Ryan was appointed Minister for Education and Youth Affairs and Minister assisting the Prime Minister for the Status of Women. She was Minister for Education in the second Hawke Ministry and opposed the re-introduction of fees for tertiary education despite strong support in Cabinet for the user-pays principle. She lost the education portfolio in the third Hawke Ministry and was instead given a much reduced role as Special Minister of State, with responsibility for the ill-fated Australia Card. Subsequently, the Higher Education Contribution Scheme was introduced to partially fund higher education.  Ryan resigned from the Senate on 29 January 1988.

Ryan had a strong focus on gender equality in politics. A private member's bill introduced by her in 1981 was crucial to the development of the Sex Discrimination Act 1984, the Affirmative Action (Equal Employment Opportunity for Women) Act 1986, the Public Service Reform Act 1984 and the Equal Employment Opportunity (Commonwealth Authorities) Act 1987. She was also a founding member of the Women's Electoral Lobby ACT branch.

After politics

Following her resignation from politics, Ryan worked as an editor and in the insurance, plastics and superannuation industries. In November 1998 Ryan was appointed one of the first two pro-chancellors of the University of New South Wales, a position she held until 2011. She was president of the Australian Institute of Superannuation Trustees from 2000 to 2007. Ryan campaigned for an Australian bill of rights and was deputy chairman of the Australian Republican Movement from 2000 to 2003.  In 1999 Ryan published a political autobiography, Catching the Waves: life in and out of politics.

In July 2011, Ryan was appointed as Australia's inaugural Age Discrimination Commissioner with the Australian Human Rights Commission for a 5-year term. She was also the Disability Discrimination Commissioner, from 2014 to 2016.

Honours and awards
Ryan was appointed an Officer of the Order of Australia (AO) in June 1990. She received honorary doctorates from the Australian National University, University of Canberra, Macquarie University and the University of South Australia.

In April 2018 Ryan was awarded the Australian National University's Alumni of the Year award.

Death 
Ryan died on 27 September 2020 in Sydney, aged 77. She had fallen ill after going for a swim on 25 September, and had been in intensive care at Prince of Wales Hospital in Randwick since then.

Paying tribute, former Prime Minister Paul Keating said Ryan's greatest achievement in politics had been as Education Minister helping lift Australian high school retention from a rate of three children in 10 to nine children in 10. Incumbent Prime Minister Scott Morrison also paid tribute, calling her a "ground breaker" as the first Minister for Women. ACT senator Katy Gallagher said Ryan campaigned that a woman's place was in "all the places where decisions were being made".

See also
List of the first women holders of political offices in Oceania

References

External links

 

1942 births
2020 deaths
Australian Labor Party members of the Parliament of Australia
Australian republicans
Members of the Australian Senate
Members of the Australian Senate for the Australian Capital Territory
Members of the Cabinet of Australia
Officers of the Order of Australia
Fellows of the Australian Institute of Company Directors
Republic Advisory Committee
University of Sydney alumni
Women members of the Australian Senate
Members of the Australian Capital Territory House of Assembly
Women government ministers of Australia
Australian Labor Party members of the Australian Capital Territory House of Assembly
20th-century Australian politicians
Australian National University alumni
20th-century Australian women politicians